"Happy" is a song written and performed by American singer, musician, and composer Danny Elfman. It was released by Anti- on October 29, 2020. The single is Elfman's first solo pop release since the 1984 album So-Lo.

In a statement, Elfman said, "I originally wrote 'Happy' to perform at Coachella 2020. It was written to be an absurd anti-pop song, designed to begin as a very simple pop tune that degrades into something more subversive. The cynical nature of the lyrics echo how I feel about living in a semi-dystopian world turned upside down."

This should not be confused with Elfman's 1987 song of the same name, which was included on the soundtrack to the film Summer School.

Credits 
Adapted from Bandcamp:

 Danny Elfman: Vocals, guitars, synths
 Josh Freese: Drums
 Nili Brosh: Guitars
 Stu Brooks: Bass
 Randall Dunn: Additional synth design
 Steve Bartek: Orchestration
 Budapest Scoring Orchestra: Orchestra

References

External links 
 

2020 singles
2020 songs
Songs written by Danny Elfman
Anti- (record label) singles